Ronney Jerone Daniels (born September 17, 1976) is a former American football wide receiver in the Arena Football League (AFL). He played for the Tampa Bay Storm and the Grand Rapids Rampage. He played college football at Auburn, where he holds the school record for receiving yards in a season with 1,068.

Prior to his college career, he played Minor League Baseball in the Montreal Expos organization.

References

1976 births
Living people
People from Lake Wales, Florida
Players of American football from Florida
American football wide receivers
Auburn Tigers football players
Tampa Bay Storm players
Grand Rapids Rampage players
Gulf Coast Expos players
Vermont Expos players